Edmund Storms is a nuclear chemist known for his work in cold fusion.

Career
He is a Nuclear Chemist who worked at Los Alamos National Lab for more than 30 years. He established Kiva Labs in Santa Fe where he continues exploration of evidence of his model of cold fusion. Storms is also a Science Advisor to Cold Fusion Now.

Storm's work is listed in the Atomic Energy of Canada Ltd. 2013 Report on cold fusion, which identifies 25 theories on the mechanisms behind cold fusion, but notes that "What was apparent from this review is that there has been a plethora of investigations and theories for CF/LENR/CMNS over the last 20 years, but a relative shortage of credible, peer-reviewed information sources."

Publications
Storms has published more than a hundred journal articles and several books. He has spoken on his work at conferences of the ACS, APS, and ICCF U.S.A.

Selected publications
 Storms, E. (2007). Science Of Low Energy Nuclear Reaction, The: A Comprehensive Compilation Of Evidence And Explanations About Cold Fusion. Singapore: World Scientific Publishing Company.

References

  
 
 
 

21st-century American chemists
Living people
1948 births
People from Camp Hill, Pennsylvania
Nuclear chemists
20th-century American chemists